is the mayor of Ōta, Gunma, Japan. As of 1 July 2010, he is also the chairman of the Gunma Kokusai Academy school in Ōta.

References

External links
 

1941 births
Living people
Mayors of places in Japan